Vladimir Yaroslavich (Old Norse Valdamarr Jarizleifsson; 1020 – October 4, 1052) reigned as prince of Novgorod from 1036 until his death. He was the eldest son of Yaroslav I the Wise of Kiev by Ingigerd, daughter of king Olof Skötkonung of Sweden.

In the state affairs he was assisted by the voivode Vyshata and the bishop Luka Zhidiata. In 1042, Vladimir may have been in conflict with Finns, according to some interpretations even making a military campaign in Finland. In the next year he led the Russian armies against the Byzantine emperor Constantine IX. He predeceased his father by two years and was buried by him in St Sophia Cathedral he had built in Novgorod. His sarcophagus is in a niche on the south side of the main body of the cathedral overlooking the Martirievskii Porch. He is depicted in an early twentieth-century fresco above the sarcophagus and on a new effigial icon on top of the sarcophagus. The details of his death is unknown, however his son Rostislav and his descendants were in unfriendly relationship with the descendants of the Yaroslaviches triumvirate (Iziaslav, Sviatoslav, and Vsevolod). Three of Vladimir's younger brothers Izyaslav I, Svyatoslav II and Vsevolod I all reigned in Kiev, while other two (Igor and Vyacheslav) died in their early twenties after which their lands were split between the Yaroslaviches triumvirate. Coincidentally, the Vyshata of Novgorod pledged his support to Rostislav in the struggle against the triumvirate.

Vladimir's only son, Rostislav Vladimirovich, was a landless prince who usurped power in Tmutarakan. His descendants were dispossessed by their uncles and were proclaimed as izgoi (outcast), but gradually managed to establish themselves in Halychyna, ruling the land until 1199, when their line became extinct. In order to downplay their claims to Kiev, the records of Vladimir's military campaigns seem to have been obliterated from Kievan chronicles. As a result, medieval historians often confuse him with two more famous namesakes — Vladimir the Great and Vladimir Monomakh. The name of Vladimir's consort is uncertain either. According to Nikolai Baumgarten, Vladimir was married to the daughter of count Leopold of Staden, Ode. Others (Aleksandr Nazarenko) disregard that assumption or claim a different person.

Vladimir's memory was better preserved in foreign sources. In Norse sagas he frequently figures as Valdemar Holti (that is, "the Nimble"). George Cedrenus noticed Vladimir's arrogance in dealing with the Byzantines.

Further reading
Volkoff, Vladimir Vladimir, the Russian Viking. Overlook Press, 1985.
Wanaselja, Lee; Saltares, Javier (art): Vladimir: Prince of Russia. Kingstone Comics, 2012. (graphic novel)

References
6.  Coggeshall, Robt W.  "Ancestors and Kin" (1988), p 189

11th-century princes in Kievan Rus'
1020 births
1052 deaths
Burials at the Cathedral of St. Sophia, Novgorod
Princes of Novgorod
Heirs apparent who never acceded